Nocturnes are musical compositions inspired by, or evocative of, night.

Nocturnes may also refer to:

Classical compositions
Nocturnes (Chopin), 21 short pieces for piano
Nocturnes, Op. 9 (Chopin)
Nocturnes, Op. 15 (Chopin)
Nocturnes, Op. 27 (Chopin)
Nocturnes, Op. 32 (Chopin)
Nocturnes, Op. 37 (Chopin)
Nocturnes, Op. 48 (Chopin)
Nocturnes, Op. 55 (Chopin)
Nocturnes, Op. 62 (Chopin)
Nocturnes (Debussy), a composition for orchestra by Claude Debussy
Nocturnes (Field), 15 piano pieces by John Field
Nocturnes (Satie), five piano pieces by Erik Satie

Albums
Nocturnes (Boxhead Ensemble album), 2006
Nocturnes (Uh Huh Her album), 2011
Nocturnes (Little Boots album), 2013

Other
Nocturnes (book), short fiction by Kazuo Ishiguro

See also
Nocturne (disambiguation)
Nocturns, Christian form of prayers